Cnicht North Top is a top of Cnicht in Snowdonia, which forms part of the Moelwynion mountain range.

It is one of the Nuttalls, a list of 443 hills in England and Wales over 2,000 ft (610 m) with a relative height of at least 49 ft (15 m). The list was compiled by John and Anne Nuttall and published in 1993 as two volumes, "The Mountains of England & Wales".

North Top is a bump on the north ridge; it is often bypassed by walkers heading for Ysgafell Wen, Moel Druman and Allt-fawr.

Height in Metres: 688 metres

References

External links
www.geograph.co.uk : photos of Cnicht and surrounding area

Beddgelert
Llanfrothen
Mountains and hills of Gwynedd
Mountains and hills of Snowdonia
Nuttalls